This Government Museum is a museum located in the town of Pudukkottai of Pudukkottai District. This is the second largest museum of Tamil Nadu after Government Museum, Chennai. The museum is divided into sections covering zoology, geology, paintings, anthropology, epigraphy. Rare ancient stone and Bronze sculptures are also found here.

References 
 

Pudukkottai district
Museums in Tamil Nadu
Local museums in India
State museums in India
Museums with year of establishment missing